This is a list of ecoregions in Belarus as defined by the World Wildlife Fund and the Freshwater Ecoregions of the World database.

Terrestrial ecoregions

Temperate broadleaf and mixed forests
 Central European mixed forests
 Sarmatic mixed forests

 
Ecoregions
Belarus